Kahun is a former village and Village Development Committee  in Kaski District in the Gandaki Zone of northern-central Nepal. In 2015, it was annexed to Pokhara. At the time of the 1991 Nepal census it had a population of 2,211.

References

External links
UN map of the municipalities of Kaski District

Populated places in Kaski District
Neighbourhoods in Pokhara